Moto Perpétuo is the eponymous debut album by the Brazilian progressive rock band originally released on 1974 vinyl edition on Phonodisc/Discos Continental label. Reissued as vinyl in 1989 and on CD format in 2002 by WEA.

Track listing
Original 1974 release

Side A:
Mal o Sol (Guilherme Arantes) 2:48
Conto Contigo (Guilherme Arantes) 2:54
Verde Vertente (Guilherme Arantes) 3:16
Matinal (Guilherme Arantes) 4:32
Três e Eu (Claudio Lucci) 5:18

Side B:
Não Reclamo da Chuva (Guilherme Arantes) 2:30
Duas (Guilherme Arantes) 2:16
Sobe (Guilherme Arantes) 3:17
Seguir Viagem (Claudio Lucci) 1:38
Os Jardins (Guilherme Arantes) 3:00
Turba (Guilherme Arantes) 5:50

Personnel
Guilherme Arantes - keyboards and vocals
Egydio Conde - lead guitar and vocals
Diógenes Burani - percussion and vocals
Gerson Tatini - bass guitar and vocals
Cláudio Lucci - acoustic guitars, cello, guitar and vocals

Original Production
Arrangements: Moto Perpétuo
Sound Supervisor: Peninha Schimidt
Sound Technicians: Francisco Luiz Russo (Zorro), e Carlos A. Dutweller
Mixing: Peninha e Zorro
Production Co-ordinator: Júlio Nagib
Production Assistant: Flávio Ferrari
Photography and Cover Artwork: Marcos A. Campacci
Production Director: Moracy do Val
Package Producer: Oscar Paolillo
Recorded and Mixed at Sonima Studios, São Paulo, Brazil, September and October 1974.

2002 CD Release Production
Remastering and Editing: Ricardo Garcia and Guilherme Calicchio at Magic Master Studios,
Rio de Janeiro, Brazil, July and August 2002.
Assistant: Sérgio Chatagnier
Original Cover and Innersleeve Restoring: Cilene Affonso and Vaner Alaimo at NewXtension Design
Graphic Revision: Silvia Panella
Production Co-ordinator: Maria Creusa Meza
Original Cover  courtesy of Charles Gavin
Acknowledgement: Eliane Mello, Paula Netto, Magic Master, NewXtension and Claudio Condé.

References

All information from liner notes from Moto Perpétuo (Copyright © 1974 Phonodisc/Discos Continental) under catalogue number 044405-010 and CD release (Copyright © 2002 WEA Records under catalogue number 092746572-2.
Planeta Guilherme Arantes  . Retrieved 24 Nov 2011.
Discogs .

1974 albums
Blue Thumb Records albums